Eugene Cecil Fleeman (April 13, 1907 – February 4, 1962) was an American politician. He was a member of the Arkansas House of Representatives, serving from 1945 to 1962. He was a member of the Democratic party.

References

1962 deaths
1907 births
People from Mississippi County, Arkansas
20th-century American politicians
Speakers of the Arkansas House of Representatives
Democratic Party members of the Arkansas House of Representatives